Râșnov Fortress is a medieval Fliehburg-type fortress, which offered refuge for townspeople and villagers from the area in times of war. It is situated in Râșnov, Brașov County, not far from Brașov.

The fortress was built as part of a defence system for the Transylvanian villages exposed to outside invasions. A decisive aspect for building the fortress at its location was the route of the invading armies which were coming from the Bran pass and were passing through Râșnov, on their way to Brașov and other parts of the Burzenland region. The only chance of survival for the inhabitants of the area, including from Cristian and Ghimbav, was the refuge inside the fortress at Râșnov. Compelled to stay there for decades, the people of Râșnov and the nearby villages turned the fortification into their long-term place of residence.

History

Archaeological research revealed the existence of fortification traces on the fortress hill since prehistoric and Dacian times.

The medieval initial fortress is considered to have been built between 1211 and 1225, during the rule of the Teutonic Knights in Burzenland, although there is no archaeological evidence in this respect.

In 1335, during a Tatar incursion that ravaged the Burzenland, Râșnov and Brașovia were the only fortified places remaining unconquered. This is also the first documented attestation of the fortification.

In 1421 the fortress was besieged for the first time by an Ottoman army.

In 1600, Michael the Brave along with his troops and his wife, Lady Stanca, retreated here after the defeat of Mirăslău.

In 1612, during the rule of Prince Gabriel Báthory, the fortress was conquered for the only time in its history. It fell due to the lack of water caused by the discovery by the enemy troops of the path leading to a secret spring.

In 1718 the fortress was partially destroyed by a fire, and in 1802 it was damaged by an earthquake.

In 1821 refugees from Wallachia (the resurgent movement led by Tudor Vladimirescu) retreated to the fortress.

Between 1848 and 1849, because the town of Râșnov lay on the way of both the Hungarian revolutionaries and the Austrian imperial troops, the inhabitants retreated to the fortress. This was the last mission of the fortress as a place of refugee and defence.

In 1850, due to the political situation and the diminution of the fortress's defensive role, the fortification was abandoned, becoming a ruin. There was only one guard left who had to announce the outbreak of fires by tolling a bell.

After the two world wars and the takeover of the communist regime in Romania, the fortress was restored for the first time, but barely, in the years 1955–1956.

In 2000–2007, an Italian entrepreneur has transformed the decaying ruins into a picturesque tourist attraction by destroying and arbitrarily rebuilding parts of the archaeological remains. The Râșnov municipality has recovered the property in 2008 and better supervised work has ensued.

The legend of the well
The absence of an internal water source led to the limitation of long-term resistance during sieges. Because of this lack, it was decided to start the digging of a well in the rocky soil, in 1623.

The legend says that during a siege, the inhabitants of the fortress made two Turkish prisoners dig a well in the middle of the fortress in order to regain their freedom. The captives dug for 17 years, during which time they wrote verses from Koran on the well walls which can be seen even today. The fate of the prisoners isn't known, with some saying that they were released, and others that they were killed.

The well was used until 1850 when a broken wheel in the well windlass caused its abandonment.

The elders of Râșnov believe that deep in the well lies a treasure at least 300 years old. However, recently alpinists have closely explored the well, without finding any trace of it.

Architecture

The fortress has a simple architectonic style, similar to the ordinary houses of the time and adapted to the fortification requirements. The builders used stones and bricks for building the walls, and woods for making the gates and platforms. The towers and walls are covered with roof tiles for preventing the fires from besiegers.

The fortress is composed of two courts. The exterior court is located in front of the eastern wall, edged by a fortified wall, and fitted with a square tower. The interior court represents the inhabitable area, having a better protection by walls and towers.

The whole superior area is defended by exterior towers gathered in the northern flank and western corner. Because of its u-shape, the eastern side of the fortress was more vulnerable due to less natural obstacles. To boost its defensive capacity, the fortress holds in this sector the heaviest fortifications.

The eastern, western and northern sides are protected by a continuous gallery with two ante forts and seven towers. There are only two towers on the southern side which is more abrupt.

The interior courtyard is paved with narrow paths made of stone, which ribbon among the tile-roofed houses. Inside there have been conserved the ruins of a school, a chapel and over thirty houses fated to refuge the villagers and their assets.

The feudal art museum
Inside the fortress there is a museum which briefly presents elements of local history, the area's habits and crafts, and also gathers artifacts and weapons from the inhabitants' past. I contains the following sections: document photocopies, weapons, tools, stamps and period objects.

Image gallery

External links

Fortress info on the city's official tourism portal

References

Buildings and structures in Brașov County
Castles in Romania
Tourist attractions in Brașov County
Historic monuments in Brașov County
Museums in Brașov County
Râșnov